Sylvia Löhrmann (born 1 March 1957, Essen, Germany) is a German politician of the Green Party.

Education and early career
Löhrmann studied German and English from 1975-1981 at the Ruhr University Bochum and later worked as a teacher.

Political career
Löhrmann is a member of the Green Party, and since 1995 an elected member of the parliament of the German state North Rhine-Westphalia. Since July 15, 2010 she has served as Deputy Minister-President and Minister of Schools and Education in the incumbent state-government under the leadership of Minister-President Hannelore Kraft. As one of the state’s representatives at the Bundesrat, she is a member of the Committee on Cultural Affairs.

On 25 March 2015, Löhrmann spoke at the memorial for 16 schoolchildren and two teachers of Joseph-König-Gymnasium who all died in the crash of Germanwings Flight 9525.

Löhrmann was a Green Party delegate to the Federal Convention for the purpose of electing the President of Germany in 2017.

Following the Green Party’s defeat in the 2017 state elections, Löhrmann was no longer a member of the state government and also resigned her parliamentary seat. In 2020, she was appointed secretary general of "321–2021: 1700 Years of Jewish Life in Germany".

Other activities

Corporate boards
 Stadt-Sparkasse Solingen, Member of the Supervisory Board
 NRW.BANK, Member of the Guarantors' Meeting (2010–2017)

Non-profit organizations
 Grüner Wirtschaftsdialog, Member of the Advisory Board (since 2021)
 Heinrich Böll Foundation, Member of the General Assembly
 Aktive Bürgerschaft, Member of the Board of Trustees
 Central Committee of German Catholics, Member
 Deutschlandradio, Member of the Broadcasting Council
 Jugend forscht, Member of the Board of Trustees
 Stiftung Lesen, Deputy Chairwoman of the Board of Trustees
 Heinrich Heine University (HHU), Institut für Deutsches und Internationales Parteienrecht und Parteienforschung, Member of the Board of Trustees
 Education and Science Workers' Union (GEW), Member

References

External links

Sylvia Löhrmann's website 
Brief biography at North Rhine-Westphalia government site 
The Green Party Candidates, North Rhine-Westphalia 2010 

1957 births
Alliance 90/The Greens politicians
Living people
Members of the Landtag of North Rhine-Westphalia
Politicians from Essen
Women members of State Parliaments in Germany
20th-century German women politicians
21st-century German women politicians